Clay pigeon may refer to:

 the target of the sport of clay pigeon shooting
 Clay pigeon floor procedure, a strategy used in the U.S. Senate
 The Clay Pigeon, a 1949 film noir
 Clay Pigeons, a 1998 film
 Clay Pigeon (film), a 1971 American action film